The Sumatran shrewlike mouse (Mus crociduroides) is a species of mouse. It is endemic to Indonesia.

This mouse is known only from the mountains of western Sumatra, where it lives in rainforest habitat. It occurs in Kerinci Seblat National Park.

References

Rats of Asia
Mus (rodent)
Endemic fauna of Indonesia
Fauna of Sumatra
Rodents of Indonesia
Mammals described in 1916
Taxonomy articles created by Polbot